Jeff Coffey (born September 11, 1967) is an American singer-songwriter and multi-instrumentalist. He is the bassist and background vocalist for Don Felder. From 2016–18 and in 2023 for select performances, he was bassist and co-lead vocalist for the  band Chicago.

Early career
Coffey grew up in Eustis, Florida in the Orlando area, and attended University of Central Florida where he traveled with their jazz band to perform at the Montreux Jazz Festival in Switzerland, and the North Sea Jazz Festival in The Hague. He spent much of the 1990s in the Gainesville, Florida-based band House of Dreams, which released a self-titled CD in 1994.

In 2007, Coffey released his second CD Long Way Home. From 2011–14, Coffey took a hiatus from music to focus on family and life. He returned to music on New Year's Eve 2014.

Chicago
In Spring 2016, Coffey received a call from Chicago guitarist Keith Howland asking if he would be interested in auditioning to fill in for longtime bassist/vocalist Jason Scheff. Coffey auditioned and won the gig, making his debut on May 21, 2016, in Findlay, Ohio at a private event. His first public performance with Chicago was the following day, May 22, 2016, also in Findlay, Ohio.  

Following Scheff's departure in October 2016, Coffey became an official member of the band. The announcement welcoming Coffey was made via Chicago's official Facebook page on October 25, 2016. Although joining the band after the production of their CNN documentary Now More than Ever, he was included in pre-broadcast interviews with the band featured on CNN in which he described the impact and legacy of Chicago's music. On January 19, 2018, Coffey announced his resignation from the band.

Post-Chicago career
On February 27, 2018, Coffey released a new single titled "Got To Get Away". Jeff also announced via Facebook on April 15, 2018 that he would be touring as a bassist with Don Felder, formerly of The Eagles. Following his departure, Chicago and Rhino Records released 2 live CD/DVD combos, Chicago II: Live on Soundstage and Chicago: Greatest Hits Live, both recorded in November 2017 for the PBS show Soundstage and aired nationally over PBS stations in the summer of 2018. In early 2019, Coffey crowd-sourced funding for his new album of classic covers, "Origins-Vocalists and the Songs That Made Me" which will be released in late 2019 by Jetpack Label Group.

Ahead of its release, Coffey released music videos for "Back On My Feet Again" (recorded by The Babys)  and "I Can't Make You Love Me" (originally by Bonnie Raitt) the latter which features Michael Omartian on production and piano. Also among the guest musicians include former Chicago bandmate Tris Imboden covering a Kenny Loggins song that Imboden performed on the original recording and Chris Rodriguez, current member of Peter Cetera's touring band.

Discography
 1994: House of Dreams (with House of Dreams) 
 2003: Jeff Coffey 
 2007: Long Way Home
 2018: Got To Get Away (Digital Single)
 2018: Chicago II On Soundstage (With Chicago)
 2018: Greatest Hits Live (With Chicago)
 2019: Origins – Vocalists And The Songs That Made Me
2019: I Can't Make You Love Me (Digital Single) Jetpack Label Group
 2021: This Time Around

References

External links
Jeff Coffey official website
Chicago official website
Jeff Coffey: Facebook Page

1967 births
Living people
21st-century American male musicians
American male bass guitarists
American male pop singers
American male singer-songwriters
American rock bass guitarists
American rock singers
American rock songwriters
American tenors
Guitarists from Florida
Musicians from Orlando, Florida
Chicago (band) members
Singer-songwriters from Florida